Victoria is both a community (civil parish) and electoral ward (division) and of the city of Newport.

The ward is bounded by the River Usk to the west and south, Newport Bridge, Clarence Place, Church Road and Christchurch Road to the north, Victoria Avenue, Wharf Road (as far as the railway bridge), a section of the Great Western Main Line as far as (but not including) Soho Street, Telford Street and Lilleshall Street to the east. The area is governed by the Newport City Council.

The ward includes the district of Maindee, as well as the home of Newport Rugby Club and the annual Maindee Festival.

The district of Victoria, Maindee in particular, is home to a large Asian population. Many people are of Pakistani and Bangladeshi origin and there are now a slowly increasing number of Kurdish refugees.

Governance
Victoria is a ward to Newport City Council, electing two councillors.

Two by-elections took place within six months in 2021, after Christine Jenkins resigned on health grounds and, in October 2021, long-serving Abdul-Majid Rahman resigned for personal reasons. Rahman was later jailed, in May 2022, having been found in possession of indecent images of children.

Labour's Gavin Horton and Farzina Hussain, who had each won a 2021 by-election, were re-elected at the May 2022 elections.

References

External links 

Communities in Newport, Wales
Wards of Newport, Wales